8128 is the integer following 8127 and preceding 8129.

It is most notable for being a perfect number (its divisors 1, 2, 4, 8, 16, 32, 64, 127, 254, 508, 1016, 2032, and 4064 add up to 8128), and one of the earliest numbers to be recognized as such. As a perfect number, it is tied to the Mersenne prime 127, 27 – 1, with 26 (27 – 1) yielding 8128. Also related to its being a perfect number, 8128 is a harmonic divisor number.

Another consequence of 8128 being a perfect number is that it has the same prime factors as the sum of its divisors, its cototient is a power of two, and it is a harmonic seed number (though there are deficient and abundant numbers that share these properties).

8128 is the 127th triangular number, the 64th hexagonal number, a happy number, the eighth 292-gonal number, and the fourth 1356-gonal number, as well as the 43rd centered nonagonal number.

See also
 8128 Nicomachus

References

Integers